"Personal Notes of an Infantryman" is a short story by J. D. Salinger. It is about an older man trying to get in the military, and then overseas to combat, despite the obstacles in his way. Collier's published it in December 1942.

References

1942 short stories
Short stories by J. D. Salinger
Works originally published in Collier's